The PlayStation Portable (PSP) is a handheld game console developed and marketed by Sony Computer Entertainment. It was first released in Japan on December 12, 2004, in North America on March 24, 2005, and in PAL regions on September 1, 2005, and is the first handheld installment in the PlayStation line of consoles. As a seventh generation console, the PSP competed with the Nintendo DS.

Development of the PSP was announced during E3 2003, and the console was unveiled at a Sony press conference on May 11, 2004. The system was the most powerful portable console when it was introduced, and was the first real competitor of Nintendo's handheld consoles after many challengers such as Nokia's N-Gage had failed. The PSP's advanced graphics capabilities made it a popular mobile entertainment device, which could connect to the PlayStation 2 and PlayStation 3, any computer with a USB interface, other PSP systems, and the Internet. The PSP also had a vast array of multimedia features such as video playback, audio playback, and has been considered a portable media player as well. The PSP is the only handheld console to use an optical disc format—in this case, Universal Media Disc (UMD)—as its primary storage medium; both games and movies have been released on the format.

The PSP was received positively by critics, and sold over 80 million units during its ten-year lifetime. Several models of the console were released, before the PSP line was succeeded by the PlayStation Vita, released in Japan in 2011 and worldwide a year later. The Vita has backward compatibility with PSP games that were released on the PlayStation Network through the PlayStation Store, which became the main method of purchasing PSP games after Sony shut down access to the store from the PSP on March 31, 2016. Hardware shipments of the PSP ended worldwide in 2014; production of UMDs ended when the last Japanese factory producing them closed in late 2016.

History 
Sony Computer Entertainment first announced development of the PlayStation Portable at a press conference preceding E3 2003. Although samples were not presented, Sony released extensive technical details. CEO Ken Kutaragi called the device the "Walkman of the 21st century", a reference to the console's multimedia capabilities. Several gaming websites were impressed with the handheld's computing capabilities, and looked forward to its potential as a gaming platform.

In the 1990s, Nintendo had dominated the handheld market since launching its Game Boy in 1989, experiencing close competition only from Sega's Game Gear (1990–2001) and Bandai's WonderSwan (1999–2003) in Japan. In January 1999, Sony had released the briefly successful PocketStation in Japan as its first foray into the handheld gaming market. The SNK Neo Geo Pocket and Nokia's N-Gage also failed to cut into Nintendo's share. According to an IDC analyst in 2004, the PSP was the "first legitimate competitor to Nintendo's dominance in the handheld market".

The first concept images of the PSP appeared at a Sony corporate strategy meeting in November 2003, and featured a model with flat buttons and no analog joystick. Although some reviewers expressed concern about the lack of an analog stick, these fears were allayed when the PSP was officially unveiled at the Sony press conference during E3 2004. Sony released a list of 99 developer companies that pledged support for the new handheld. Several game demos such as Konami's Metal Gear Acid and Studio Liverpool's Wipeout Pure were also shown at the conference.

Launch 
On October 17, 2004, Sony announced that the PSP base model would be launched in Japan on December 12 that year for ¥19,800 (about US$181 in 2004) while the Value System would launch for ¥24,800 (about US$226). The launch was a success, with over 200,000 units sold on the first day of sales. Color variations were sold in bundle packs that cost around $200. On February 3, 2005, Sony announced that the PSP would be released in North America on March 24 in one configuration for an MSRP of US$249/CA$299. Some commentators expressed concern over the high price, which was almost US$20 higher than that of the Japanese model and over $100 higher than the Nintendo DS. Despite these concerns, the PSP's North American launch was a success; Sony said 500,000 units were sold in the first two days of sales, though it was also reported that this figure was below expectations.

The PSP was originally intended to have a simultaneous PAL and North American launch, but on March 15, 2005, Sony announced that the PAL launch would be delayed due to high demand for the console in Japan and North America. The next month, Sony announced that the PSP would be launched in the PAL region on September 1, 2005, for €249/£179. Sony defended the high price by saying North American consumers had to pay local sales taxes and that the Value Added Tax (sales tax) was higher in the UK than the US. Despite the high price, the PSP's PAL launch was a success, with the console selling over 185,000 units in the UK. All stock of the PSP in the UK sold out within three hours of its launch, more than doubling the previous first-day sales record of 87,000 units set by the Nintendo DS. The system also enjoyed great success in other areas of the PAL region; over 25,000 units were pre-ordered in Australia and nearly one million units were sold across Europe in the system's first week of sales.

Hardware 

The PlayStation Portable uses the common "bar" form factor. The front of the console is dominated by the system's  LCD screen, which is capable of 480 × 272 pixel display resolution with 24-bit color, outperforming the Nintendo DS. Also on the unit's front are the four iconic PlayStation face buttons; the directional pad, the analog "nub", and several other buttons. The system also has two shoulder buttons, a USB 2.0 mini-B port on the top of the console, and a wireless LAN switch and power cable input on the bottom. The back of the PSP features a read-only Universal Media Disc (UMD) drive for access to movies and games, and a reader compatible with Sony's Memory Stick PRO Duo flash cards is located on the left of the system. Other features include an IrDA-compatible infrared port (this was discontinued in PSP-2000 and later) and a two-pin docking connector; built-in stereo speakers and headphone port; and IEEE 802.11b Wi-Fi for access to the Internet, free online multiplayer gaming via PlayStation Network, the ability to purchase games from PlayStation Store (now discontinued), and data transfer.

The PSP uses two 333 MHz MIPS32 R4000 R4k-based CPUs, as a main CPU and Media Engine, a GPU running at 166 MHz, and includes 32 MB main RAM (64 MB on PSP-2000 and later models), and 4 MB embedded DRAM split between the aforementioned GPU and Media Engine. The hardware was originally forced to run more slowly than it was capable of; most games ran at 222 MHz. With firmware update 3.50 on May 31, 2007, however, Sony removed this limit and allowed new games to run at 333 MHz.

The PSP is powered by an 1800 mAh battery (1200 mAh on the 2000 and 3000 models) that provides between about three and six hours of gameplay, between four and five hours of video playback, or between eight and eleven hours of audio playback.

To make the unit slimmer, the capacity of the PSP's battery was reduced from 1800 mAh to 1200 mAh in the PSP-2000 and 3000 models. Due to more efficient power use, however, the expected playing time is the same as that of older models. The original high-capacity batteries work on the newer models, giving increased playing time, though the battery cover does not fit. The batteries take about 1.5 hours to charge and last for between four-and-a-half and seven hours depending on factors such as screen brightness settings, the use of WLAN, and volume levels. In March 2008, Sony released the Extended Life Battery Kit in Japan, which included a bulkier 2200 mAh battery with a fitting cover. In Japan, the kit was sold with a specific-colored cover matching the many PSP variations available. The North American kit released in December 2008 was supplied with two new covers; one black and one silver.

Revisions

PSP-2000 

The PSP-2000, marketed in PAL countries as the "PSP Slim", is the first redesign of the PlayStation Portable. The UK release for the PSP-2000 was September 14.

The serial port was modified to accommodate a new video-out feature, making it incompatible with older PSP remote controls. On the PSP-2000, games only output to external monitors and televisions in progressive scan mode. Non-game video outputs work in either progressive or interlaced mode. USB charging was introduced and the D-Pad was raised in response to complaints of poor performance and the responsiveness of the buttons was improved.

Other changes include improved WLAN modules and micro-controller, and a thinner, brighter LCD screen. To improve the poor loading times of UMD games on the original PSP, the internal memory (RAM and Flash ROM) was doubled from 32 MB to 64 MB, part of which now acting as a cache, also improving the web browser's performance.

PSP-3000 
In comparison with the PSP-2000, the 3000, marketed in PAL areas as "PSP Slim & Lite" or "PSP Brite", has an improved LCD screen with an increased color range, five times the contrast ratio, a halved pixel response time, new sub-pixel structure, and anti-reflective technology to reduce outdoor glare. The disc tray, logos, and buttons were all redesigned, and a microphone was added. Games could now be output in either component or composite video using the video-out cable. Some outlets called this model "a minor upgrade".

In its first four days on sale in Japan, the PSP-3000 sold over 141,270 units, according to Famitsu; it sold 267,000 units during October.

On its release, a problem with interlacing when objects were in motion on the PSP-3000 screen was noticed. Sony announced this problem would not be fixed.

PSP Go (N1000) 

The PSP Go (model PSP-N1000) was released on October 1, 2009, in North American and European territories, and on November 1 in Japan. It was revealed prior to E3 2009 through Sony's Qore video on demand service. Its design is significantly different from other PSP models.

The unit is 43% lighter and 56% smaller than the original PSP-1000, and 16% lighter and 35% smaller than the PSP-3000. Its rechargeable battery is not intended to be removed by the user. It has a  480 × 272 pixel LCD screen, which slides up to reveal the main controls. The overall shape and sliding mechanism are similar to those of Sony's mylo COM-2 Internet device.

The PSP Go features 802.11b Wi-Fi like its predecessors, although the USB port was replaced with a proprietary connector. A compatible cable that connects to other devices' USB ports is included with the unit. The new multi-use connector allows video and sound output with the same connector using an optional composite or component AV cable. As with previous models, Sony also offers a cradle (PSP-N340) for charging, video out, and USB data transfer on the PSP Go. This model adds support for Bluetooth connectivity, which enables the playing of games using a Sixaxis or DualShock 3 controller. The use of the cradle with the controller allow players to use the PSP Go as a portable device and as a console, although the output is not upscaled. PlayStation 1 games can be played in full screen using the AV/component cable or the cradle.

The PSP Go lacks a UMD drive, and instead has 16 GB of internal flash memory, which can be extended by up to 32 GB with the use of a Memory Stick Micro (M2). Games must be downloaded from the PlayStation Store. The removal of the UMD drive effectively region-locks the unit because it must be linked to a single, region-locked PlayStation Network account. While the PSP Go can download games to itself, users can also download and transfer games to the device from a PlayStation 3 console, or the Windows-based software Media Go.

All downloadable PSP and PlayStation games available for older PSP models are compatible with the PSP Go. Sony confirmed that almost all UMD-based PSP games released after October 1, 2009, would be available to download and that most older UMD-only games would also be downloadable.

In February 2010, it was reported that Sony might re-launch the PSP Go due to the lack of consumer interest and poor sales. In June 2010, Sony began bundling the console with 10 free downloadable games; the same offer was made available in Australia in July. Three free games for the PSP Go were offered in America. In October that year, Sony announced it would reduce the price of the unit. On April 20, 2011, the manufacturer announced that the PSP Go would be discontinued outside of North America so it could concentrate on the PlayStation Vita.

PSP Street (E1000) 

The PSP-E1000, which was announced at Gamescom 2011, is a budget-focused model that was released across the PAL region on October 26 of that year. The E1000 lacks Wi-Fi capability and has a matte finish similar to that of the slim PlayStation 3. It has a monaural speaker instead of the previous models' stereo speakers and lacks a microphone. This model also lacked the physical brightness buttons from the front of the handheld, instead offering brightness controls in the System Software's 'Power Save Settings' menu.

An ice-white version was released in PAL territories on July 20, 2012.

Bundles and colors 
The PSP was sold in four main configurations. The Base Pack, called the Core Pack in North America, contained the console, a battery, and an AC adapter. This version was available at launch in Japan and was released later in North America and Europe.

Many limited editions of the PSP were bundled with accessories, games, or movies.

The first initial release of the Slims in North America on September 5, 2007, sold Daxter PSPs. Included with the bundle was an Ice Silver PSP with a Daxter UMD, the Family Guy : Freaking Sweet Collection, and a 1 GB Memory Stick for usage.

Limited-edition models were first released in Japan on September 12, 2007; North America and Europe on September 5; in Australia on September 12, and in the UK on October 26. The PSP-2000 was made available in piano black, ceramic white, ice silver, mint green, felicia blue, lavender purple, deep red, matte bronze, metallic blue, and rose pink as standard colors. Several special-edition consoles were colored and finished to sell with certain games, including Final Fantasy VII: Crisis Core (ice silver engraved), Star Ocean: First Departure (felicia blue engraved), Gundam (red gloss/matte black), and Monster Hunter Freedom (gold silkscreened) in Japan, Star Wars (Darth Vader silkscreened), and God of War: Chains of Olympus (Kratos silkscreened) in North America, The Simpsons (bright yellow with white buttons, analog and disc tray) in Australia and New Zealand, and Spider-Man (red gloss/matte black) in Europe.

The PSP-3000 was made available in piano black, pearl white, mystic silver, radiant red, vibrant blue, spirited green, blossom pink, turquoise green and lilac purple. The limited edition "Big Boss Pack" of Metal Gear Solid: Peace Walker had a camouflage pattern while the God of War: Ghost of Sparta bundle pack included a black-and-red two-toned PSP. The Dissidia 012 Final Fantasy Cosmos & Chaos edition that was released on March 3, 2011, has an Amano artwork as the PSP's face plate.

Comparison 
Below is a comparison of the different PlayStation Portable models:

Software

System software 

The PSP runs a custom operating system referred to as the System Software, which can be updated over the Internet, or by loading an update from a Memory Stick or UMD. Sony offers no method for downgrading such software.

While System Software updates can be used with consoles from any region, Sony recommends only downloading updates released for the model's region. System Software updates have added many features, including a web browser, Adobe Flash support, additional codecs for various media, PlayStation 3 (PS3) connectivity, and patches against security exploits and the execution of homebrew programs. The most recent version, numbered 6.61, was released on January 15, 2015.

Apps and functionality

Web browser 

The PSP Internet Browser is a version of the NetFront browser and came with the system via the 2.00 update. The browser supports most common web technologies, such as HTTP cookies, forms, CSS, and basic JavaScript. It features basic tabbed browsing and has a maximum of three tabs.

Remote Play 

Remote Play allows the PSP to access many of the features of the PlayStation 3 console from a remote location using the PS3's WLAN capabilities, a home network, or the Internet. Using Remote Play, users can view photographs, listen to music, and watch videos stored on the PS3 or connected USB devices. Remote Play also allows the PS3 to be turned on and off remotely and lets the PSP control audio playback from the PS3 to a home theater system. Although most of the PS3's capabilities are accessible with Remote Play, playback of DVDs, Blu-ray Discs, PlayStation games, PlayStation 2 games, most PS3 games, and copy-protected files stored on the hard drive are not supported.

VoIP access 
Starting with System Software version 3.90, the PSP-2000, 3000, and Go could use the Skype VoIP service. Due to hardware constraints it was not possible to use the service on the PSP-1000. The service allowed Skype calls to be made over Wi-Fi and – on the Go – over the Bluetooth modem. Users had to purchase Skype credit to make telephone calls. Skype for PlayStation®Portable was discontinued on June 22, 2016.

Room for PlayStation Portable 

At Tokyo Game Show 2009, Sony announced that a service similar to PlayStation Home, the PS3's online community-based service, was being developed for the PSP. Named "Room" (stylized R∞M), it was being beta-tested in Japan from October 2009 to April 2010. It could be launched directly from the PlayStation Network section of the XMB. As in Home, PSP owners would have been able to invite other PSP owners into their rooms to "enjoy real time communication".

SensMe application 
The SensMe software, which had already existed on some Walkman music players and Sony Ericsson handsets, was added to the PSP through a software update in 2009. It is a music analyser that reads music files stored on the PSP and categorises them into "channels" representing moods and creates automatic playlists from it. The PSP has support for the playback of MP3 and ATRAC audio files, as well as WMA since firmware version 2.60.

Digital Comics Reader 
Sony partnered with publishers such as Rebellion Developments, Disney, IDW Publishing, Insomnia Publications, Marvel Comics, and Titan Books to release digitized comics on the PlayStation Store. The Digital Comics Reader application required PSP firmware 6.20.

In early 2010 the application was expanded to the German, French, Spanish and Italian languages. The choice of regional Comic Reader software is dictated by the PSP's firmware region; the Japanese Comic Reader will not display comics purchased from the European store, and vice versa. Sony shut down the Digital Comics service in September 2012.

x-Radar Portable 
In Japanese market PSPs, an application called x-Radar Portable came preloaded starting with firmware version 6.35 (January 2010). This is a port of a map software for PCs and mobile phones called x-Radar, developed by PetaMap. x-Radar Portable gets the location of the PSP on a map and obtains information of places around the user. It determines the location through "PlaceEngine" technology, via wireless LAN spots.

Homebrew development and custom firmware 

On June 15, 2005, hackers disassembled the code of the PSP and distributed it online. Initially the modified PSP allowed users to run custom code and a limited amount of protected software, including custom-made PSP applications such as a calculator or file manager. Sony responded to this by repeatedly upgrading the software. Some users were able to unlock the firmware to allow them to run more custom content and DRM-restricted software. Hackers were able to run protected software on the PSP through the creation of ISO loaders that could load copies of UMD games from a memory stick. Custom firmware including the M33 Custom Firmware, Minimum Edition (ME/LME) CFW and PRO CFW were commonly seen in PSP systems.

Content management 
The management of media content of the PSP through personal computers was fulfilled by Sony's PSP Media Manager software for Windows, allowing transfer as well as music/video playback and backups. In 2009 the PSP Media Manager was replaced by Media Go.

Games 

There were 1,370 games released for the PSP during its 10-year lifespan. Launch games for PSP included; Ape Escape: On the Loose (North America, Europe, Japan), Darkstalkers Chronicle: The Chaos Tower (North America, Europe, Japan), Dynasty Warriors (all regions), Lumines (North America, Europe, Japan), Metal Gear Acid (North America, Europe, Japan), Need for Speed: Underground Rivals (North America, Europe, Japan), NFL Street 2: Unleashed (North America, Europe), Ridge Racer (North America, Europe, Japan), Spider-Man 2 (2004) (North America, Europe, Japan), Tiger Woods PGA Tour (North America, Europe, Japan), Tony Hawk's Underground 2 Remix (North America, Europe), Twisted Metal: Head-On (North America, Europe), Untold Legends: Brotherhood of the Blade (North America, Europe, Japan), Wipeout Pure (all regions), and World Tour Soccer: Challenge Edition (North America, Europe). Additionally, Gretzky NHL and NBA were North America exclusive launch titles. The best selling PSP game is Grand Theft Auto: Liberty City Stories, which sold 7.6 million copies as of October 2015.

Other top selling PSP games include Grand Theft Auto: Vice City Stories, Monster Hunter Portable 3rd, Gran Turismo, and Monster Hunter Freedom Unite. Retro City Rampage DX, which was released in July 2016, was the final PSP game that was released. The best rated PSP games on Metacritic are God of War: Ghost of Sparta, Grand Theft Auto: Vice City Stories, and Daxter, Metal Gear Solid: Peace Walker is the only PSP game to receive a perfect score from Famitsū. During E3 2006, Sony Computer Entertainment America announced that the Greatest Hits range of budget titles were to be extended to the PSP system. On , 2006, Sony Computer Entertainment America  released the first batch of Greatest Hits titles. These titles included Ape Escape:On the Loose, ATV Offroad Fury: Blazin' Trails, Hot Shots: Open Tee, Twisted Metal: Head-On, and Wipeout Pure. The PSP Greatest Hits lineup consists of games that have sold 250,000 copies or more and have been released for nine months. PSP games in this lineup retail for $19.99 each. Downloadable games were limited to 1.8 GB, most likely to guarantee a potential UMD release. A section of the PlayStation Store was dedicated to "Minis"; smaller, cheaper games available as download only.

Trophy support was planned for the PSP but the idea was cancelled after the firmware was cracked.

Demos and emulation 
In late 2004, Sony released a series of PSP demo games, including Duck In Water, world/ball, Harmonic City, and Luga City. Demos for commercial PSP games could be downloaded and booted directly from a Memory Stick. Demos were sometimes issued in UMD format and mailed out or given to customers at retail outlets. In addition, several older PlayStation games were re-released; these can be played on the PSP using emulation. , this feature could be officially accessed through the PlayStation Network service for PlayStation 3, PSP, PlayStation Vita (or PlayStation TV), or a personal computer. Emulation of the PSP is well-developed; one of the first emulators was JPCSP, which run on Java. PPSSPP is currently the fastest and most compatible PSP emulator; it supports all major games.

Data installation 
In mid 2009, as larger memory stick storage became available for the PSP, the ability to pre-install some or all data from a game became a feature in certain games. Although for a large majority of the games the feature merely improved load times, there were a small number of games that added features, such as speech in Metal Gear Solid: Peace Walker.

Peripherals 

Official accessories for the console include an AC adapter, car adapter, headset, headphones with remote control, extended-life 2200 mAh battery, battery charger, console carrying case, game carrying case, accessories pouch and cleaning cloth, and system pouch and wrist strap. A 1seg television tuner peripheral (model PSP-S310), designed specifically for the PSP-2000, was released in Japan on September 20, 2007.

Sony sold a GPS accessory for the PSP-2000; this was released first in Japan and announced for the United States in 2008. It features maps on a UMD and offers driving directions and city guides. A digital camera add-on, the Go!Cam, was also released.

After the discontinuation of PSP, the Chinese electronics company Lenkeng released a PSP-to-HDMI converter called the LKV-8000. The device is compatible with the PSP-2000, PSP-3000 and PSP Go. To overcome the problem of PSP games being displayed in a small window surrounded by a black border, the LKV-8000 has a zoom button on the connector. A few other Chinese companies have released clones of this upscaler under different names, like the Pyle PSPHD42. The LKV-8000 and its variants have become popular among players and reviewers as the only means of playing and recording PSP gameplay on a large screen.

Reception 

The PSP received generally positive reviews soon after launch; most reviewers noted similar strengths and weaknesses. CNET awarded the system 8.5 out of 10 and praised the console's powerful hardware and its multimedia capabilities but lamented the lack of a guard to cover the screen and the reading surface of UMD cartridges. Engadget praised the console's design, stating that "it is definitely one well-designed, slick little handheld". PC World commended the built-in Wi-Fi capability but criticized the lack of a web browser at launch, and the glare and smudges that resulted from the console's glossy exterior. Most reviewers also praised the console's large, bright viewing screen and its audio and video playback capabilities. In 2008, Time listed the PSP as a "gotta have travel gadget", citing the console's movie selection, telecommunications capability, and upcoming GPS functionality.

The PlayStation Portable was initially seen as superior to the Nintendo DS when both devices were revealed in early 2004 because of the designers' emphasis on the technical accomplishments of the system. Nintendo of America President Reggie Fils-Aime, however, focused on the experience aspect of the Nintendo DS. The DS started to become more popular than the PSP early on because it attracted more third-party developers, and appealed more to the casual gaming market. The DS sold more units partly because of its touchscreen and second display.

From a multimedia perspective, the PSP has also been seen as a competitor to portable media players, notably the iPod Video that was released in the same year.

Reviews of the PSP Go were mixed. It was mainly criticized for its initial pricing; Ars Technica called it "way too expensive" and The Guardian stated that cost was the "biggest issue" facing the machine. Engadget said the Go cost only $50 less than the PS3, which has a Blu-ray player. Wired said the older PSP-3000 model was cheaper and supports UMDs, and IGN stated that the price increase made the PSP Go a "hard sell". The placement of the analog stick next to the D-pad was also criticized. Reviewers also commented on the change from a mini-USB port to a proprietary port, making hardware and cables bought for previous models incompatible. The Go's screen was positively received by Ars Technica, which called the screen's image "brilliant, sharp and clear" and T3 stated that "pictures and videos look great". The controls received mixed reviews; The Times described them as "instantly familiar" whereas CNET and Stuff called the position of the analog stick "awkward". The device's capability to use a PS3 controller was praised by The New Zealand Herald but Ars Technica criticized the need to connect the controller and the Go to a PS3 for initial setup.

Sales 

By March 31, 2007, the PlayStation Portable had shipped 25.39 million units worldwide with 6.92 million in Asia, 9.58 million in North America, and 8.89 million Europe. In Europe, the PSP sold 4 million units in 2006 and 3.1 million in 2007, according to estimates by Electronic Arts. In 2007, the PSP sold  units in the US, according to the NPD Group and 3,022,659 in Japan according to Enterbrain. In 2008, the PSP sold 3,543,171 units in Japan, according to Enterbrain.

In the United States, the PSP had sold 10.47 million units by January 1, 2008, according to the NPD Group. In Japan, during the week –30, 2008, the PSP nearly outsold all of the other game consoles combined, selling 129,986 units, some of which were bundled with Monster Hunter Portable 2nd G, which was the bestselling game in that week, according to Media Create.

From 2006 to the third quarter of 2010, the PSP sold 53 million units. In a 2009 interview, Peter Dillon, Sony's senior vice-president of marketing, said piracy of video games was leading to lower sales than hoped. Despite being aimed at a different audience, the PSP competed directly with the Nintendo DS. During the last few years of its life cycle, sales of the PSP models started to decrease. Shipments to North America ended in January 2014, later in Europe, and on June 3, 2014, Sony announced sales of the device in Japan would end. Production of the device and sales to the rest of Asia would continue. During its lifetime, the PSP sold 80 million fewer units than the Nintendo DS.

Marketing controversies 
In late 2005, Sony said it had hired graffiti artists to spray-paint advertisements for the PSP in seven major U.S. cities, including New York City, Atlanta, Philadelphia, and San Francisco. According to Sony, it was paying businesses and building owners for the right to spray-paint their walls. A year later, Sony ran a poster campaign in England; a poster bearing the slogan "Take a running jump here" was removed from a Manchester Piccadilly station tram platform due to concerns it might encourage suicide.

Later in 2006, news of a billboard advertisement released in the Netherlands depicting a white woman holding a black woman by the jaw, saying "PlayStation Portable White is coming", spread. Two similar advertisements existed; one showed the two women facing each other on equal footing in fighting stances, the other showed the black woman in a dominant position on top of the white woman. Sony's stated purpose was to contrast the white and black versions of the PSP but the advertisements were interpreted as being racially charged. These advertisements were never released in the rest of the world and were withdrawn from the Netherlands after the controversy. The advertisement attracted international press coverage; Engadget said Sony may have hoped to "capitalize on a PR firestorm".

Sony came under scrutiny online in December 2006 for a guerrilla marketing campaign in which advertisers posed as young bloggers who desperately wanted a PSP. The site was created by advertising firm Zipatoni.

See also 
 Sony Ericsson Xperia Play

Notes

References

External links 

 Official Australia website
 Official New Zealand website
 Official UK PSP website
 Official US website
 Official Canada website
 

 
Products and services discontinued in 2014
Handheld game consoles
PlayStation (brand)
Portable media players
Products introduced in 2004
Discontinued handheld game consoles
Regionless game consoles
Sony consoles
Seventh-generation video game consoles